Wood Township is one of twelve townships in Clark County, Indiana. As of the 2010 census, its population was 2,747 and it contained 1,148 housing units.

History
Wood Township was named for George Wood, a pioneer settler.

Geography
It is 11 miles NW of Louisville, KY.

Cities and towns
 Borden

Unincorporated towns
 Chestnut Hill
Pulltight
 Starlight
(This list is based on USGS data and may include former settlements.)

Adjacent townships
 Polk Township, Washington County (north)
 Monroe Township (northeast)
 Carr Township (east)
 Lafayette Township, Floyd County (southeast)
 Greenville Township, Floyd County (southwest)
 Jackson Township, Washington County (west)

Major highways
  Indiana State Road 60

Cemeteries
The township contains several cemeteries: African-American Cemetery near Daisy Hill Cemetery, Borden Town, Daisy Hill, Dow, Emmanuel, Fisher, Gibson, Goss, Goss II, Gruen, Hallett, Johnson, McKinley-Packwood, New Chapel, Newman/Fisher, Pleasant Ridge, Robertson, St. John the Baptist Catholic Church, Walnut Hill, Whitson, and Wood.

References
 United States Census Bureau cartographic boundary files
 U.S. Board on Geographic Names

External links

 Indiana Township Association
 United Township Association of Indiana

Townships in Clark County, Indiana
Townships in Indiana